Persatuan Sepakbola Tojo Una-Una or Pestu Touna is an Indonesian football club based in Tojo Una-Una Regency, Central Sulawesi. They currently play at Liga 3.

Honours
 Liga 3 Central Sulawesi
 Champions: 2019

References

External links
Pestu Touna Instagram

Football clubs in Indonesia
Football clubs in Central Sulawesi
Association football clubs established in 1963
1963 establishments in Indonesia